John Angus McPhee (born March 8, 1931) is an American writer. He is considered one of the pioneers of creative nonfiction. He is a four-time finalist for the Pulitzer Prize in the category General Nonfiction, and he won that award on the fourth occasion in 1999 for Annals of the Former World (a collection of five books, including two of his previous Pulitzer finalists). In 2008, he received the George Polk Career Award for his "indelible mark on American journalism during his nearly half-century career". Since 1974, McPhee has been the Ferris Professor of Journalism at Princeton University.

Background 
McPhee has lived in Princeton, New Jersey, for most of his life. He was born in Princeton, the son of the Princeton University athletic department's physician, Dr. Harry McPhee. He was educated at Princeton High School, then spent a postgraduate year at Deerfield Academy, before graduating from Princeton University in 1953 with a senior thesis titled "Skimmer Burns", and spending a year at Magdalene College, University of Cambridge. McPhee was a member of University Cottage Club while he was a student at Princeton.

While at Princeton, McPhee went to New York once or twice a week to appear as the juvenile panelist on the radio and television quiz program Twenty Questions. One of his roommates at Princeton was 1951 Heisman Trophy winner Dick Kazmaier.

Twice married, McPhee is the father of four daughters from his first marriage to Pryde Brown: the novelists Jenny McPhee and Martha McPhee, photographer Laura McPhee, and architecture historian Sarah McPhee.

Writing career 
McPhee's writing career began at Time magazine, and led to a long association with the weekly magazine The New Yorker from 1963 to the present.  Many of his twenty-nine books include material originally written for The New Yorker, where he has been a staff writer since 1965.

Unlike Tom Wolfe and Hunter Thompson, who helped kick-start the "new journalism" of the 1960s, McPhee produced a gentler, more literary style of writing that more thoroughly incorporated techniques from fiction. McPhee avoided the streams of consciousness styles of Wolfe and Thompson, but used detailed description of characters and vivid language to make his writing lively and personal, even when it focused on obscure or difficult topics.  He is highly regarded by fellow writers for the quality, quantity, and diversity of his literary output.

Reflecting his personal interests, McPhee's subjects are highly eclectic. He has written pieces on lifting-body development (The Deltoid Pumpkin Seed), the psyche and experience of a nuclear engineer (The Curve of Binding Energy), a New Jersey wilderness area (The Pine Barrens), the United States Merchant Marine (Looking for a Ship), farmers' markets (Giving Good Weight), the movement of coal across America ("Coal Train" in Uncommon Carriers), the shifting flow of the Mississippi River ("Atchafalaya" in The Control of Nature), geology (in several books), as well as a short book entirely on the subject of oranges. One of his most widely read books, Coming into the Country, is about the Alaskan wilderness.

McPhee has profiled a number of famous people, including conservationist David Brower in Encounters with the Archdruid, and the young Bill Bradley, whom McPhee followed closely during Bradley's four-year basketball career at Princeton University.

Teaching 
McPhee has been a nonfiction writing instructor at Princeton University since 1974, having taught generations of aspiring undergraduate writers as the Ferris Professor of Journalism. Many of McPhee's students have achieved their own distinction for writing:
 David Remnick, Pulitzer Prize-winning author, and editor-in-chief of The New Yorker since 1998
 Richard Stengel, former managing editor of Time magazine
 Jim Kelly, former managing editor of Time magazine
 Robert Wright, former senior editor at The New Republic and columnist for Time, Slate and the New York Times, and author of award-winning books
 Eric Schlosser, author of Fast Food Nation and other books
 Richard Preston, author of The Hot Zone and other books about infectious disease epidemics and bioterrorism
 Peter Hessler, contributor to The New Yorker and author of three books about China
 Timothy Ferriss, entrepreneur and author of The 4-Hour Workweek and The 4-Hour Body
 Joel Achenbach, writer for the Washington Post and author of seven books
 Jennifer Weiner, best-selling author of Good In Bed, In Her Shoes, and other novels

Awards and honors 
McPhee has received many literary honors, including the Award in Literature from the American Academy of Arts and Letters, and the 1999 Pulitzer Prize for General Non-Fiction, awarded for Annals of the Former World. In 1978 McPhee received a LittD from Bates College, in 2009 he received an honorary Doctorate of Letters from Yale University, and in 2012 he received an honorary Doctorate of Humane Letters from Amherst College.

 Pulitzer Prize (1999) for Annals of the Former World
 Award in Literature from the American Academy of Arts and Letters (1977)
 Elected member of the American Academy of Arts and Sciences (1993)
 Finalist, National Book Award (science) for The Curve of Binding Energy
 Nominated, National Book Award (science), for Encounters with the Archdruid
 Wallace Stegner Award (2011) for "sustained contribution to the cultural identity of the West through literature, art, history, lore, or an understanding of the West".
 National Book Critics Circle Award Ivan Sandrof Lifetime Achievement Award (2017)

Bibliography

Books

Selected essays and reporting

Notes

References 
 Weltzein, O. Alan and Susan N. Maher (2003). Coming into McPhee Country: John McPhee and the Art of Literary Criticism. .

External links 

 Publisher's official web site

 

1931 births
Alumni of Magdalene College, Cambridge
American expatriates in the United Kingdom
American non-fiction environmental writers
Deerfield Academy alumni
John Burroughs Medal recipients
Living people
Members of the American Academy of Arts and Letters
People from Princeton, New Jersey
Pine Barrens (New Jersey)
Princeton High School (New Jersey) alumni
Princeton University alumni
Princeton University faculty
Pulitzer Prize for General Non-Fiction winners
The New Yorker people
20th-century American non-fiction writers
21st-century American non-fiction writers
The New Yorker staff writers